Makemie is a Scottish surname.  It may refer to:

 Francis Makemie (1658-1708), Ulster Scots clergyman considered the founder of Presbyterianism in the United States
 Anne Makemie Holden (1702-c. 1787/88), early American patriot, younger daughter of Rev. Francis Makemie
 Makemie Memorial Presbyterian Church in Snow Hill, Maryland
 Makemie Monument Park, formerly known as Pocomoke Farm, maintained in honor of Rev. Francis Makemie in Accomack County, Virginia, 
 Makemie Park, Virginia